Joseph Kenneth Ssebaggala or "Joseph S KEN" (born 1983) is a Ugandan film director, screenwriter. In 2008 he started taking film training and workshops, like the Durban Talent Campus 2011. As a writer, producer and director he runs a film company called Zenken Films, under which he has produced two of his feature films: Master on Duty and That Small Piece. He is the recent winner of Best Director in the 2015 Uganda Film Festival with his House Arrest.

His 2015 Call 112 and House arrest were nominated in the 2016 AMVCA for best East African film, Best Lighting, and overall film of the year making him the most nominated Uganda so far in the Awards.

Filmography

Master on Duty (2009
Akataka/That Small Piece (2011)
Reform (2014)
Call 112 (2015)
House Arrest (2015)

References

External links
 

Living people
Ugandan film directors
Ganda people
Makerere University alumni
Ugandan screenwriters
Ugandan film producers
1983 births